The Erasmus Riggs House, near Carlisle, Kentucky, is a stone house built in 1820.  It was listed on the National Register of Historic Places in 1983.

It is a one-and-a-half-story dry stone hall-parlor plan house.  It includes elements of Federal style, and is notable especially as a work of Thomas Metcalf (stonemason and later governor of Kentucky).

See also
List of buildings constructed by Thomas Metcalfe

References

Houses on the National Register of Historic Places in Kentucky
Federal architecture in Kentucky
Houses completed in 1820
National Register of Historic Places in Nicholas County, Kentucky
Thomas Metcalfe buildings
Stone houses in Kentucky
1820 establishments in Kentucky
Hall-parlor plan architecture in the United States
Houses in Nicholas County, Kentucky